A Cat in Paris is a 2010 animated adventure crime film by the French 2D animation studio Folimage, telling the story of a young Parisian girl whose cat leads her to unravel a thrilling mystery over the course of a single evening. The film was directed by Alain Gagnol and Jean-Loup Felicioli.

A Cat in Paris was first screened on 15 October 2010 at the Saint-Quentin Ciné-Jeune Film Festival. It was released in French theaters on 15 December 2010. International distribution is by Films Distribution, Paris.

The film was nominated for the Academy Award for Best Animated Feature.

Plot
A black cat with red stripes leads a double life. During the night, he accompanies a burglar named Nico (who calls him Mr. Cat), who performs heists to steal jewels. During the day, he lives with a girl named Zoé (who calls him Dino). Zoé, who lost her voice after the loss of her father, has become distant from her mother Jeanne who works as a police superintendent, and is looked after by a lady named Claudine.

Nico gives Dino a fish-shaped bracelet, which he passes on to Zoé. At the police station Jeanne briefs her colleagues on protecting the Colossus of Nairobi statue, which cost her husband his life at the hands of the notorious Victor Costa. Victor Costa intends to have another go at the statue while it is being moved, with help from his codenamed accomplices, M. Bébé (Mr. Baby), M. Hulot, M. Grenouille (Mr. Frog), and M. Patate (Mr. Potato).

Back at home, Jeanne takes interest in the fish-shaped bracelet and brings it to her colleague Lucas. Lucas deduces that the bracelet matches up with burgled items from Rue Mouffetard. Zoé sneaks out of her house and follows Dino. She spies Victor's lot, and finds Claudine is working for Victor and has been gaining insight on police movements. Zoé is spotted, but is rescued by Nico. Nico takes Zoé to hide in the zoo, but Victor's gang pick up her trail. Fortunately Zoé escapes in a boat.

Lucas finds a lead on the robberies trailing directly to Nico's residence. When Nico returns to find Zoé at his place, he is arrested by Jeanne and Lucas, presumably having kidnapped Zoé. Jeanne leaves Zoé in Claudine's custody and goes with Lucas to find Victor. Unable to convince Jeanne and Lucas of Zoé's predicament, Nico escapes in order to find Zoé. Jeanne is able to confirm that Nico's claim about Zoé is true.

Claudine has taken Zoé to Costa's house, where she is locked away. Thanks to Claudine's perfume, Dino follows the scent and leads Nico to the house. Nico is able to whisk Zoé away after he cuts the power and dons his night goggles. Victor pursues Nico and Zoé to Notre Dame. Nico falls while trying to mislead Victor, but is saved by Jeanne, who has just arrived at the scene.

As Victor captures Zoé, Jeanne, with Nico and Dino, come to the rescue. Nico has to save Dino when Victor pushes the cat over the edge of a nearby crane, leaving Jeanne to confront Victor. Plucking up her courage, Jeanne saves her daughter and strikes Victor, putting him in a hallucinatory trance. Before Jeanne can help Victor, the gang leader swings from the crane to what he imagines is the Colossus of Nairobi, but falls to his death to a truck below. The rest of the gang, including Claudine, are arrested and Zoé regains her voice.

Nico reforms himself, gives up thievery, and becomes a member of the family, while Dino becomes the household pet. Nico gives Jeanne a snow globe with the Cathedral of Notre Dame in it as a Christmas present.

Voice cast

Reception

Critical response
A Cat in Paris has an approval rating of 83% on review aggregator website Rotten Tomatoes, based on 64 reviews, and an average rating of 6.79/10. The website's critical consensus states, "A Cat in Paris depicts a stylish, imaginative world with a wonderful soundtrack and Hitchcockian overtones". It also has a score of 63 out of 100 on Metacritic, based on 20 critics, indicating "generally favorable reviews".

Prior to the Oscar nomination, the film was little-seen in the United States, although it screened at a few children's film festivals. The New York Times called it "a gorgeous hand-drawn feature that is one of the highlights of this festival. ... Without being too frightening, it projects a sense of danger, both physical and emotional, that is more engaging than the high-pitched thrills of the domestic films."

Time Out Chicago Kids gave the film four out of five stars, describing how "this cartoon noir distills Hitchcock into 64 brisk minutes for middle-schoolers and up"; the review elaborated that the film "announces its retro visual style with a dynamic title sequence that zips across the screen, bursting with Saul Bass-influenced dynamism." It also noted that, despite the title given to the film in English-speaking countries, "its French title, Une Vie de Chat, translates as A Cat's Life."

See also
 The Aristocats
 Gay Purr-ee

References

External links
 
 
 
 
 
 

2010 films
2010 animated films
2010s crime comedy films
2010s French animated films
French crime comedy films
Dutch animated films
Swiss animated films
Swiss comedy films
Belgian animated films
Belgian comedy films
2010s French-language films
Dutch crime comedy films
Animated films set in Paris
French detective films
Dutch detective films
Swiss detective films
Belgian detective films
2010s children's animated films
Animated comedy films
Folimage films
Animated films about cats
2010 comedy films
French-language Swiss films
2010s French films